Lindsay Heathcote "Bob" Briggs (3 January 1905 – 16 January 1975) was a New Zealand organic chemist.

Early life
Born in Hastings in 1905, Briggs was educated at Auckland Grammar School.

Academic career
After graduating from Auckland University College with a Master of Science with second-class honours in 1928, he received funding to research manuka oil the following year, and undertook independent research at Massey Agricultural College from 1929 to 1930.

He then went to the Dyson Perrins Laboratory at Oxford University for a PhD under Robert Robinson, investigating the chemical structure of strychnine. He was awarded his doctorate in 1932 and returned to Auckland, where he was appointed as a lecturer in organic chemistry in 1933.

In 1941 he was awarded a DSc from Auckland University College. He was elected a Fellow of the Royal Society of New Zealand in 1942 and served as its president from 1956 to 1958. He was awarded the Hector Medal by the society in 1943. In 1953, he was awarded the Queen Elizabeth II Coronation Medal.

He was also an active member of the Auckland University field club.

References

1905 births
1975 deaths
People from Hastings, New Zealand
People educated at Auckland Grammar School
New Zealand chemists
Organic chemists
University of Auckland alumni
Alumni of the University of Oxford
Academic staff of the University of Auckland
20th-century New Zealand scientists
Presidents of the Royal Society of New Zealand